Alfred Raymond Bellinger (Durham, 24 July, 1893 – 12 February, 1978) was an American archaeologist and numismatist. He taught at Yale University and took part in the Dura-Europos excavations and published the book: Dura final report, VI, The coins.

Selected publications
 The Coinage of the Western Seleucid Mints from Seleucus I to Antiochus III. (with Edward Theodore Newell) Series: Numismatic Studies no. 4. New York: American Numismatic Society, 1941. 
 The end of the Seleucids, 1949.
 Troy, the coins, 1961.
 Catalogue of Byzantine Coins in the Dumbarton and in Whittemore Collection, (with Philip Grierson), Washington, 1966-1973.

References

1893 births
1978 deaths
People from Bucks County, Pennsylvania
20th-century American archaeologists

Scholars of Byzantine numismatics
Yale University faculty